Affliction or Afflicted may refer to:

Books
 Affliction (novel), a 2013 Anita Blake: Vampire Hunter novel by Laurell K. Hamilton
 Affliction, a novel by Russell Banks, basis of the 1998 film

Film and TV
 Affliction (1997 film), a 1997 American drama by Paul Schrader
 Affliction (1996 film), a 1996 American documentary film
 Affliction (2021 film), a 2021 Indonesian horror film
 "Affliction" (Star Trek: Enterprise), an episode of Star Trek: Enterprise
 Afflictions: Culture & Mental Illness in Indonesia, a 2010–2011 ethnographic documentary film series
 The Afflicted (film), a 2011 American horror film by Jason Stoddard
 Afflicted (film), a 2013 Canadian horror film by Derek Lee and Clif Prowse
 Afflicted (TV series), a 2018 Netflix documentary series

Brands 
 Affliction Clothing, an American clothing manufacturer and retailer
 Affliction Entertainment, a defunct mixed martial arts promotion company created by Affliction Clothing

Music
 Afflicted (Swedish band), a Swedish technical death metal band
 The Afflicted (American band), a punk band
 Affliction (album), a 1996 album by Econoline Crush

See also
 Disease
 Suffering